Marc Montgomery may refer to:

Marc Montgomery, voice actor in Animal Crackers (TV series)
Marc Montgomery, candidate for Mid Sussex (UK Parliament constituency)
Marc Montgomery (presenter) on Radio Canada International

See also
Mark Montgomery (disambiguation)